The Selfoss women's handball team is the women's handball section of Icelandic multi-sport club Selfoss from Selfoss. It currently plays in the Úrvalsdeild kvenna

Players

Current squad
As of the 2019–20 season.

Goalkeepers (GK)
 12  Dröfn Sveinsdóttir
 15  Henriette Ostergaard
Left Wingers (LW)
 }9  Rakel Guðjónsdóttir
 11  Agnes Sigurðardóttir
 12  Elínborg Katla Þorbjörnsdóttir

Right Wingers (RW)
 23  Þuríður Ósk Ingimarsdóttir
 81  Carmen Palmariu
Pivots (P)
 30  Katla Björg Ómarsdóttir 
 37  Sigríður Lilja Sigurðardóttir 

Left Backs (LB)
 3  Hulda Dís Þrastardóttir
 19  Katla Björg Magnúsdóttir
Central Backs (CB)
 3  Hólmfríður Arna Steinsdóttir
 33  Sólveig Erla Oddsdóttir
Right Backs (RB)
 20  Tinna Sigurrós Traustadóttir
 21  Elín Krista Sigurðardóttir

Trophies

References

External links
 Official site
 Club profile at hsi.is

Handball teams in Iceland
Women's handball clubs